Boehmite or böhmite is an aluminium oxide hydroxide (γ-AlO(OH)) mineral, a component of the aluminium ore bauxite. It is dimorphous with diaspore. It crystallizes in the orthorhombic dipyramidal system and is typically massive in habit. It is white with tints of yellow, green, brown or red due to impurities. It has a vitreous to pearly luster, a Mohs hardness of 3 to 3.5 and a specific gravity of 3.00 to 3.07. It is colorless in thin section, optically biaxial positive with refractive indices of nα = 1.644 - 1.648, nβ = 1.654 - 1.657 and nγ = 1.661 - 1.668.

Boehmite occurs in tropical laterites and bauxites developed on alumino-silicate bedrock. It also occurs as a hydrothermal alteration product of corundum and nepheline.  It occurs with kaolinite, gibbsite and diaspore in bauxite deposits; and with nepheline, gibbsite, diaspore, natrolite and analcime in nepheline pegmatites. Industrially, it is used as an inexpensive flame retardant additive for fire-safe polymers.

It was first described by J. de Lapparent in 1927 for an occurrence in the bauxites of Mas Rouge, Les Baux-de-Provence, France, and named for the Bohemian-German chemist Johann Böhm  (1895–1952) who carried out X-ray studies of aluminium oxide hydroxides in 1925 (and not for the German geologist Johannes Böhm (1857–1938) as often stated).

See also
List of minerals
List of minerals named after people

References

Steven Dutch, 2002, Lepidocrocite and Boehmite Structure, University of Wisconsin - Green Bay

Hydroxide minerals
Aluminium minerals
Orthorhombic minerals
Minerals in space group 63